The Eucleian Society was a student literary society begun at New York University in 1832. According to New York University records, it ceased to exist around the 1940s.

The society was dedicated to furthering the literary arts. Members held hour-long debates, preceded by readings of essays, orations, and poems. The Eucleian Society published orations and poems delivered by guest speakers at annual or anniversary meetings. In the 20th century, the Eucleians published three literary magazines: The Knickerbocker, The Medley, and The Geyser.

Origins
 
In 1832 sixteen students began the Eucleian Society at New York University, originally under the name "Adelphic Society".  After debate the name Eucleian was chosen in honor of Eukleia- εὔκλεια, the Goddess of Repute, Glory and War, associated with Artemis, the Goddess of the Hunt and protector of women and children. The society had as a rival, the Philomathean Society at New York University. While both societies forbade membership in their rival society, early records show that members were sometimes punished when discovered to be holding mutual membership and a few resigned to join the rival society.

During the period of its founding, student societies such as Eucleian Society collected their own libraries and augmented their instruction by employing the noted minds of their day. Literary and debate societies offered a departure from the learn-by-rote instruction that prevailed in much of university instruction. Benefiting from a trust formed by A. Ogden Butler and family, the organization had a stable source of funding. The Eucleian Society provided its membership at NYU with a library and augmented student instruction. The University gave the society its own rooms at the Main University Building. The Eucleian Meeting Parlor was said to be "fitted up in a style of taste and elegance highly creditable to the young gentlemen members."

Culture

On occasion Eucleians hosted open forums for important topics of the day, inviting lecturers of great popularity and fame. Edgar Allan Poe, who lived in New York City, was a guest reciter at at least one Eucleian and Philomathean society joint meeting. Politics, current affairs, literature (especially the Gothic and Romantic popular in the era), and university events seems to have been the most popular topics for internal essays, orations and discussions. Until the turn of the 20th century, officers of the Eucleians also gave public speeches at commencement, apparently occupying a central position in those functions.
 
In the 20th century, the Eucleians published three literary magazines: The Knickerbocker, The Medley, and The Geyser. The Knickerbocker, although bearing the same title as the commercial magazine The Knickerbocker launched in 1833, was a student magazine launched in the turn of the 20th century and apparently only published twice, March 1900 and January 1901.

In the late 1930s and 1940s the society became increasingly separate from the university despite having on-campus accommodations. Numbers in the organization dwindled in the 1940s as a result of World War II.  Another cause for Eucleian’s lower profile seems to have been the perception of elitism by other NYU students.  A quip in a yearbook of the era describes Eucleian as having membership that includes “John Quincy Adams, The Rockefellers, and that crowd”.  (The organization did consist largely of the social "elite" of the time.) This alleged snobbery also became a theme of self-effacing humor in the diminishing external publications of the society in this era; the society refers to itself, and presumably Andiron Club as "the reclusive old Establishment" in a 1930s NYU yearbook. This tongue-in-cheek reference had to do with the club not taking part as a unit in spirited student games, competitions and hazing of freshmen that occurred in the early fall at NYU.

According to New York University records, the Eucleian Society ceased to exist around the 1940s. In 2017, the society was revived by MFA graduates of the NYU Creative Writing Program, with the premise of continuing the tradition of intellectual exploration and literary discussion in an inclusive and welcoming atmosphere. The revived society is open to both NYU alumni and current students.

External links 

 Records of the Eucleian Society at New York University Archives

References

New York University
1832 establishments in New York (state)
College literary societies in the United States